The Richard TOM-1 was a prototype torpedo-carrying floatplane that was designed in the Soviet Union in the early 1930s that was not accepted for production.  It was a mid-wing monoplane, with twin engines, and twin floats. The empennage consisted of a single tail-plane and three vertical fins.

Specifications (variant specified)

References

Bibliography

External links

1930s Soviet patrol aircraft
Floatplanes
Twin-engined tractor aircraft
Aircraft first flown in 1931
Mid-wing aircraft
Triple-tail aircraft